John Rappaport is an American producer and screenwriter. He was nominated for eight Primetime Emmy Awards. Rappaport had written the series finale "Goodbye, Farewell and Amen" of the television series M*A*S*H, along with Alan Alda, Burt Metcalfe, Dan Wilcox, Thad Mumford, Elias Davis, David Pollock and Karen Hall.

References

External links 

Living people
Year of birth missing (living people)
Place of birth missing (living people)
American television producers
American male screenwriters
American television writers
American male television writers
20th-century American screenwriters